Nicolas Dhuicq (born 29 November 1960 in Paris) is a French politician. He is the mayor of Brienne-le-Château and a former member of the National Assembly of France from 2007 to 2017.  He represented Aube's 1st constituency  as a member of "Les Républicains", formerly known as the Union for a Popular Movement. 

In 2022, Dhuicq announced that he was supporting Éric Zemmour and had joined Reconquête.

References

1960 births
Living people
Politicians from Paris
Debout la France politicians
The Popular Right
Mayors of places in Grand Est
Deputies of the 13th National Assembly of the French Fifth Republic
Deputies of the 14th National Assembly of the French Fifth Republic
Reconquête politicians
Members of Parliament for Aube